Tari Signor is an American actress.

Biography 
Born in Harrisburg, Pennsylvania, Signor has appeared off-Broadway as Juliet in Death Defying Acts (1995), as Rose in Mr. Peters' Connections (1998), as Hippolyte in Moliere's The Bungler, Troilus and Cressida (2001), and as Alison Regan in Scattergood (2003).

Signor portrayed Margaret Cochran on the daytime soap opera One Life to Live in 2004 and 2005, and made extended appearances in 2006. Signor made two appearances on the show in 2008, on January 17 and December 18.

Signor's other television credits include Law & Order: Criminal Intent and Third Watch. She also has been featured in commercials for products such as 7Up and Midol.

Signor's feature film credits include Rudy Blue and The Doghouse.

Filmography

Television 

 A Deadly Vision (1997)
 Law & Order: Criminal Intent (2004), 1 episode
 Third Watch (2004), 1 episode
 Law & Order (2007), 1 episode
 One Life to Live (2005-2008)

Film 

 Thanksgiving (1990)
 Rudy Blue (1999)
 The Doghouse (2000)

Theater 

 Richard II (1993)
 Death Defying Acts (1995)
 Search for Meaning (1998)
 A Woman of No Importance (1998)
 Twelfth Night (1999)
 The Bungler (2000)
 Troilus and Cressida (2001)
 Scattergood (2003)

References

External links
Lortel Archives entry
 

1967 births
Living people
American stage actresses
American soap opera actresses
American television actresses
American film actresses
Actresses from Pennsylvania
Actors from Harrisburg, Pennsylvania
21st-century American women